Maria Celeste (born Virginia Gamba) was a Roman Catholic nun, and also the illegitimate daughter of the Italian scientist Galileo Galilei. 

Maria Celeste may also refer to:

Maria Celeste (crater), a crater on Venus named after Galileo's daughter
María Celeste (film), a 1945 Argentine film directed by Julio Saraceni
María Celeste (telenovela), a Venezuelan telenovela from 1994

People
María Celeste Arrarás (born 1960), Puerto Rican journalist
Maria Celeste Nardini (1920–2020), an Italian politician
Giulia Crostarosa (1696–1755), an Italian Roman Catholic nun who took the religious name Maria Celeste

See also
Mary Celeste, sometimes mistakenly called Maria Celeste, a noted 19th-century sailing ship found abandoned